The Darunta Dam is located on the Kabul River near Darunta, approximately  west of Jalalabad, the capital of Nangarhar Province in eastern Afghanistan. It is owned and operated by the country's Ministry of Energy and Water. The dam's hydroelectric power station is being rehabilitated at a cost of $10.5 million.

History

Darunta Dam was built in the early 1960s under the supervision of engineers from the Soviet Union. Its power station contains three vertical Kaplan turbines (six-blade propeller) with a rated output of  each.

In 2011, an American company by the name of ANHAM was contracted by USAID to perform the initial rehabilitation of the Darunta power plant. Later, the USAID abandoned the repair work due to Gul Agha Sherzai not paying 10% of the project's $11 million total cost. Sherzai was Nangarhar's governor at the time.

See also

List of dams and reservoirs in Afghanistan

References

External links

Darunta Hydroelectric Power Plant Rehabilitation

Dams in Afghanistan
Buildings and structures in Nangarhar Province
Hydroelectric power stations in Afghanistan
Afghanistan–Soviet Union relations
Dams completed in 1964
Dams on the Kabul River
Soviet foreign aid
1964 establishments in Afghanistan